Ravenscrag may refer to:

Ravenscrag, Saskatchewan, a settlement in Saskatchewan, Canada
Ravenscrag Formation, a stratigraphical unit in the Western Canadian Sedimentary Basin
Ravenscrag, Montreal, a former mansion in the Golden Square Mile
SS Ravenscrag, a British clipper (later bark) that in 1879 brought Portuguese settlers to Hawaii
Ravenscrag (Judges Guild), a 1981 role-playing game adventure

See also
 Ravenscraig (disambiguation)